

Lje 

Ljeskovik, Ljesovina

Lju 

Ljubuča, Ljubuški, Ljuta

Lists of settlements in the Federation of Bosnia and Herzegovina (A-Ž)